Gangadhara Vajapeyi/ Gangadhara Vajapeyin / also known by names Gangadhara Adhvarin and  Gangadhara Suri  was a great vedic scholar of the Yajurveda from Thiruvalangadu in Nagapattinam district of Tamil Nadu. He was son of Shri Deva Nrisimha Bhatta and Sumati, whose ancestors were connected with Appayya Dikshita.  Gangadhara Vajapeyi was a grandson of  Samarapungava Dikshita who had authored books like Advaita Vidyatilakam  and Yatra Prabandha. Samarapungava Dikshita was a sororal nephew of Appayya Dikshita. Gangadhara was a disciple of Visvarupa. He was a Smarta brahmin belonging to the Vadhula gotra.

He was an expert in Nyaya and Tarka Shastra. He was one of the eight jewels at the court of Maratha king Serfoji I of Tanjore. He had performed the Vajapeya yagna, which was presided by the Maratha King Serfoji and such given title of Vajapeyi.

Most importantly, he is remembered as the Guru of Bhaskararaya – one of the greatest shrauta scholar and exponent of the tantra of recent times. Bhaskararaya acquired knowledge of the Nyaya sastra and Tarka sastra from Gangadhara Vajapeyin.  Bhaskararaya was one of the foremost authority Shri Vidya, which he learned from Gandahara Vajapeyi . Bhaskararaya's commentary on the Lalita sahasranama (bhashya) and his commentary on the Shri Vidya mantra and worship are most well known.

Gangadhara, his disciple Bhaskararaya and Krishnananda Saraswati were all senior contemporaries of Ayyaval and Bodhendra.

Gangadhara Vajapeyin built the shrine of Utpaleshwarar and Utpalaamba, which has been looked after by his descendants. The two idols of Meru of Panchaloha and gold are preserved in this temple.

Gangadhara Vajapeyi's Works

He wrote a rare commentary on Kuvalayananda in year 1700  (a book on Alankara Shastra) of Appayya Dikshitar viz: Rasikaranjani., which one of his most noted books.

He also wrote Avaidika Darsana Samgraha. The work was very popular in South India and is considered to be an important source book on Buddha-Jaina fundamentals next to Sarva-darśana-saṅ̇graha  of Vidyaranya.

His other works include; Bhosalavamsavali, which deals in systems of philosophy,  Kanadasidhhanta cándrika or Kanada Siddhantachandrika  a work on vaisesika. and a commentary or Samhita on Dharmasastra called  Dharmasamhita.

References

External links

His Books
 kanada Siddhantachandrika
 Kanada Siddhantachandrika Original
 devasimha sumati
 Titles of primary texts
 Names of persons
 Avaidika darsana samgrah
 Avaidika darsana samgraha
 Avaidika Darsana Sangraha – Vani Vilasa Mudralaya
 Reference to Rasika-ranjani
 As commentator on Appayya's work

As Bhaskararaya's Guru
 Bhaskararaya's Guru
 In Bhaskararaya's life
 Bhaskararaya's Guru
 Reference to Siddhantacandrika on Gautama's Nyayasutras and Kanada's Vaisesikasutras

Indian Hindu spiritual teachers
17th-century Hindu religious leaders
Advaitin philosophers
Sanskrit writers
Indian Sanskrit scholars
17th-century Indian scholars
People from Thanjavur district
Writers from Tamil Nadu
Scholars from Tamil Nadu